The Bismarck Tribune is a daily newspaper with a weekly audience of 82,000 unique readers, printed daily in Bismarck, North Dakota. Owned by Lee Enterprises, it is the only daily newspaper for south-central and southwest North Dakota.

History 

Founded in 1873 by Clement A. Lounsberry, the Bismarck Tribune published its first issue on July 11, 1873. It has been known as the Bismarck Daily Tribune (1881–1916) and Bismarck Tri-Weekly Tribune (1875–1881).

Battle of the Little Bighorn 
The Tribunes first claim to fame came in 1876, when the three-year-old paper published the first reports of George Custer's last stand at the Little Bighorn. Reporter Mark H. Kellogg accompanied Custer and his men and died during the battle.

Awards 
In 1938, the paper won the Pulitzer Prize for Public Service after publishing a series of articles called "Self-Help in the Dust Bowl."

Notable reporters
 Mark Kellogg

See also
 List of newspapers in North Dakota

References

External links

Newspapers published in North Dakota
Pulitzer Prize-winning newspapers
Bismarck, North Dakota
1873 establishments in Dakota Territory
Pulitzer Prize for Public Service winners
Publications established in 1873
Lee Enterprises publications
Daily newspapers published in the United States